Lukáš Janič (born 30 December 1986) is a professional Slovak football midfielder who plays for Tatran Oravské Veselé.

Career statistics

Last updated: 16 May 2010

External links
 
 MFK Košice profile 
 

1986 births
Living people
Sportspeople from Prešov
Slovak footballers
Slovak expatriate footballers
Slovakia under-21 international footballers
1. FC Tatran Prešov players
FC VSS Košice players
Korona Kielce players
Sandecja Nowy Sącz players
Podbeskidzie Bielsko-Biała players
FC ViOn Zlaté Moravce players
FK Teplice players
MFK Zemplín Michalovce players
ŠKF Sereď players
MFK Ružomberok players
ŠK Odeva Lipany players
TJ Tatran Oravské Veselé players
Association football midfielders
Slovak Super Liga players
2. Liga (Slovakia) players
3. Liga (Slovakia) players
Ekstraklasa players
I liga players
Czech First League players
Slovak expatriate sportspeople in Poland
Slovak expatriate sportspeople in the Czech Republic
Slovak expatriate sportspeople in Austria
Expatriate footballers in Poland
Expatriate footballers in the Czech Republic
Expatriate footballers in Austria